Bolt Action is a miniature wargame produced by Warlord Games. It is set during World War II and uses 28mm-sized models. The game was developed by Alessio Cavatore and Rick Priestley. The first edition of the rulebook was published in 2012, and the second edition was published in 2016. Supplements for the game include: The Korean War, and Konflikt '47, set in a Dieselpunk and supernatural alternate history of World War II.
The game has multiple playable armies such as the Soviet Union, British Empire, United States, German Third Reich, and Empire of Japan. The game also has a few smaller or supporting armies such as France, British Commonwealth, Australia, Belgium, Finland, Poland, Bulgaria, Kingdom of Romania, China and Kingdom of Italy as well as rules for major battles such as The Battle of Stalingrad, Pegasus Bridge, Battle of Berlin and D day. Some starter Boxes can symbolize the Campaigns done in World War 2 like the American Island Hopping Campaign against the Empire of Japan in the  Island Assault  box and African Campaign with the British Empire and German Third Reich in the 
A Gentleman's War box

Bibliography

Reception
Bolt action has been awarded a 7.8 out of 10 overall rating by BoardGameGeek. The game has also been described as the leading World War 2 wargame by many people worldwide.

References

External links
 Bolt Action official website (Warlord Games)
 Bolt Action

Miniature wargames
Miniature painting
Wargames introduced in the 2010s